Yannick Lupien (born February 21, 1980 in Laval, Quebec, Canada) is a former freestyle swimmer who represented Canada at the 2000 and 2004 Summer Olympics.  His best Olympic result was sixth place as a member of the Canadian team in the 4x100-metre medley relay in Sydney in 2000. Originally from Aylmer, Quebec, in 2012 Lupien began a career as a professional firefighter in Trois-Rivières, Quebec, Canada.

References

1980 births
Living people
Canadian male freestyle swimmers
Commonwealth Games bronze medallists for Canada
Medalists at the FINA World Swimming Championships (25 m)
Olympic swimmers of Canada
Sportspeople from Laval, Quebec
Swimmers at the 1999 Pan American Games
Swimmers at the 2000 Summer Olympics
Swimmers at the 2004 Summer Olympics
Swimmers at the 2006 Commonwealth Games
World Aquatics Championships medalists in swimming
Commonwealth Games medallists in swimming
Pan American Games bronze medalists for Canada
Pan American Games medalists in swimming
Laval Rouge et Or athletes
Medalists at the 1999 Pan American Games
Medallists at the 2006 Commonwealth Games